Blue Mound State Park is a state park in Wisconsin, United States, located atop the largest hill in the southern half of the state, near the village of Blue Mounds. The  park features a pair of observation towers affording views of the Wisconsin River valley and Baraboo Range to the north, the mounds, buttes, and rolling forests of the Driftless Area to the south and west, and the young glacial plains and city of Madison to the east.

Geology
The mountain, as most of the other large mounds of the Driftless Area, is an outlier of Niagara dolomitic limestone. It is a monadnock, having been created through centuries of erosion, with the harder dolomite being more weather-resistant than the other surrounding rock of the region.

Activities and amenities
The park contains a large open field, a swimming pool (the only one in a Wisconsin state park), shelters, campsites, and many miles of trails for hiking, biking, cross-country skiing and snowshoeing. There is a nature center by the picnic area with natural history exhibits.  Naturalists offer programs in the summer. The Military Ridge State Trail, which follows the natural east-west contour of the ridgeline from Fitchburg to Dodgeville, abuts on the southern edge of the park.

The park is used as the finish line for the Horribly Hilly Hundreds bicycle challenge ride. In Chicago's bid for the 2016 Summer Olympics, the park would have contained the finish line for the road cycling race.

Friends of Blue Mound State Park
A volunteer group, the Friends of Blue Mound State Park, is a group of volunteers working to benefit the park by enhancing and preserving its natural resources, while offering activities and projects that improve the park guests' visits.  The Friends play a key role in many special events, including the annual Candlelight Ski, annual campout, trail construction and interpretive presentations.

Places of interest
East viewing tower
West viewing tower
Pleasure Valley
Picnic area (at the top of the Hill and the top of several hiking trails)
Pool and splash pad (summer only)
Indian Tree Marker

Gallery

References

External links
Blue Mound State Park Wisconsin Department of Natural Resources
Friends of Blue Mound State Park

State parks of Wisconsin
Nature centers in Wisconsin
Protected areas established in 1959
Protected areas of Dane County, Wisconsin
Protected areas of Iowa County, Wisconsin
1959 establishments in Wisconsin